Shalom Meir Tower (Migdal Shalom Meir; commonly known  as Migdal Shalom) is an office tower in Tel Aviv, Israel.  It was Israel's first skyscraper.

Overview
Shalom Meir Tower was designed by architects Yitzhak Pearlstein, Gideon Ziv, and Meir Levy.

50,000 cubic meters of concrete, 4,000 tons of steel, 35 km of water pipes, and 500 km of wiring were used in the tower.

When its construction was completed in 1965, it was the tallest building in the Middle East, as well as the tallest in Asia, and rivaled the tallest buildings in Europe in height. It was the last building in Western Asia to be the tallest building in Asia until the Burj Khalifa in Dubai was completed in 2010.

History

The tower was built on the site of the Herzliya Hebrew High School, better known as Herzliya Gymnasium. The school's architecturally and historically significant structure was razed and the school relocated in order to build the tower in 1962. This decision was later regretted and the contour of the Herzliya Gymnasium became the emblem of the Society for Preservation of Israel Heritage Sites (SPIHS).

Construction was carried out by the Meir Brothers, Moshe, Mordechai and Menachem Meir, who named it after their father, Reb Shalom-Shachna Meir, born in Sanok in Galicia. Shalom-Shachna Meir married the daughter of a rich manufacturer from the Romanian region of Moldova, where he lived until 1920, becoming a successful businessman as well as a leader of the local Zionists. In 1920 he emigrated to Palestine where he became an important public figure in the early years of Tel Aviv, a member of the town's first city council, and one of the founders of Ramat Gan.

The building has a cream hue tile facade which was created especially for the tower and was manufactured in Italy. A subway station was built under the tower block, but rails were never laid and the station remains empty and disconnected from any rail system.

Artwork and exhibits
The ground-floor retail promenade features a mosaic mural by the Israeli artist Nachum Gutman facing another one by David Sharir. The Shalom Tower now houses the Tel Aviv Center comprising a number of permanent and temporary exhibitions dedicated to the beginnings and development of Tel Aviv.

See also
List of tallest buildings in Israel
Architecture in Israel
Economy of Israel

References

External links
Shalom Tower Galleries official website 

Office buildings completed in 1965
Skyscrapers in Tel Aviv
Residential skyscrapers in Israel
Skyscraper office buildings in Israel